The Perfume of the Lady in Black (French: Le parfum de la dame en noir) is a 1931 French mystery film directed by Marcel L'Herbier and starring Roland Toutain, Huguette Duflos, and Marcel Vibert. It is an adaptation of the 1908 novel The Perfume of the Lady in Black by Gaston Leroux featuring the detective Joseph Rouletabille. It follows on from L'Herbier's The Mystery of the Yellow Room made the previous year.

It was shot at the Francoeur Studios in Paris. The film's sets were designed by the art director Pierre Schild.

Cast
 Roland Toutain as Joseph Rouletabille 
 Huguette Duflos as Mathilde 
 Marcel Vibert as Le vieux Bob 
 Léon Belières as Sainclair 
 Edmond Van Daële as Robert Darzac 
 Wera Engels as Edith Rance 
 Kissa Kouprine as Marie 
 Henri Kerny as Le père Jacques 
 Michel Kovally as Le prince Galitch

References

Bibliography 
 Dayna Oscherwitz & MaryEllen Higgins. The A to Z of French Cinema. Scarecrow Press, 2009.
 Spicer, Andrew. Historical Dictionary of Film Noir. Scarecrow Press, 2010.

External links 
 

1931 films
French mystery films
1931 mystery films
1930s French-language films
Films directed by Marcel L'Herbier
French black-and-white films
Films based on French novels
Films based on works by Gaston Leroux
Films shot in Paris
Films shot at Francoeur Studios
1930s French films